The Men's quadruple sculls event at the 2010 South American Games was held over March 22 at 11:00.

Medalists

Records

Results

References
Final

Quadruple Scull M